Rideau-Vanier Ward is a ward in the city of Ottawa, designated as Ward 12 and represented on Ottawa City Council. It was originally created in 1994 as a Ward on Regional Council.

Prior to Ottawa's amalgamation in 2001, the Ward was partly in the former city of Vanier and partly in Ottawa, in Bruyère-Strathcona Ward, its predecessor. This ward was created in 1994 from parts of By-Rideau Ward and St. George's Ward.

By-St. George's Ward covered this area from 1972 to 1980 (excluding Vanier). It was created from the merging of By Ward and St. George's Ward, and abolished when it was split into St. George's Ward and By-Rideau Ward.

Councillors

Neighbourhoods
ByWard Market
Lowertown
Sandy Hill
Vanier

Election results

1972 Ottawa municipal election

1974 Ottawa municipal election

1976 Ottawa municipal election

1978 Ottawa municipal election

1994 elections

1997 elections

2000 Ottawa municipal election

2003 Ottawa municipal election

2006 Ottawa municipal election

2010 Ottawa municipal election

2014 Ottawa municipal election

2018 Ottawa municipal election

2022 Ottawa municipal election

References

External links
 Map of Rideau-Vanier Ward

Ottawa wards
1994 establishments in Ontario